These are the results from the open water swimming competition at the 2001 World Aquatics Championships, which took place in Fukuoka, Japan.

Medal table

Medal summary

Men

Women

 
2001 in swimming
Open water swimming
Open water swimming at the World Aquatics Championships